András Mészáros (born 12 April 1941) is a Hungarian former cyclist. He competed at the 1964 Summer Olympics and the 1968 Summer Olympics. He won the 1963 edition of the Tour de Hongrie.

References

External links
 

1941 births
Living people
Hungarian male cyclists
Olympic cyclists of Hungary
Cyclists at the 1964 Summer Olympics
Cyclists at the 1968 Summer Olympics
People from Szentes
Sportspeople from Csongrád-Csanád County